Antenor Lucas, better known as Brandãozinho (born in Campinas, Brazil, June 9, 1925 – died in São Paulo, Brazil, April 4, 2000) was a Brazilian football defender.

In his career (1940–1956), he played for Campinas, Associação Atlética Portuguesa Santista and Associação Portuguesa de Desportos. He won two Torneio Rio-São Paulo in 1952 and 1955. For the Brazil National Football Team, he played 18 games, and participated in the 1954 FIFA World Cup in Switzerland, playing 3 matches.

After he retired, he was a Mathematics Teacher in Lavras and Sete Lagoas, Brazil. He died at 74 years old.

References

1925 births
2000 deaths
Brazilian footballers
Association football defenders
1954 FIFA World Cup players
Brazil international footballers